The 1958 Australian Championships was a tennis tournament that took place on outdoor Grass courts at the White City Tennis Club, Sydney, Australia from 17 January to 27 January. It was the 46th edition of the Australian Championships (now known as the Australian Open), the 13th held in Sydney, and the first Grand Slam tournament of the year.  The singles titles were taken by Ashley Cooper and Angela Mortimer.

Champions

Men's singles

 Ashley Cooper defeated  Malcolm Anderson 7–5, 6–3, 6–4

Women's singles

 Angela Mortimer defeated  Lorraine Coghlan 6–3, 6–4

Men's doubles
 Ashley Cooper /  Neale Fraser defeated  Roy Emerson /   Robert Mark 7–5, 6–8, 3–6, 6–3, 7–5

Women's doubles
 Mary Bevis Hawton /  Thelma Coyne Long defeated  Lorraine Coghlan /  Angela Mortimer 7–5, 6–8, 6–2

Mixed doubles
 Mary Bevis Hawton  /  Bob Howe defeated  Angela Mortimer /  Peter Newman 9–11, 6–1, 6–2

References

External links
 Australian Open official website

1958
1958 in Australian tennis
January 1958 sports events in Australia